The Valencian Bible was the first printed Bible in the Valencian language—According to the same translator, in our Valencian language—. It was first printed between 1477 and 1478. It is the third Bible printed in a modern language (the preceding ones were printed in German in 1466 and Italian in 1471). The first printed Bible was the Latin Bible, Vulgate version, printed at Mainz in 1455.

The first complete Catalan  Bible translation was produced by the Catholic Church, between 1287 and 1290. It was entrusted to Jaume de Montjuich by Alfonso II of Aragon. Remains of this version can be found in Paris (Bibliothèque Nationale). (Ref?)

During the Inquisition, all copies were burned, and Daniel Vives, who was considered to be the main author, was imprisoned. However, the translation is now ascribed to Bonifaci Ferrer.

The last surviving paper sheet of this Bible is at the Hispanic Society in New York City.

See also 
Bible translations into Catalan

Notes

References
 Jordi Ventura, La Bíblia Valenciana, Barcelona: Curial, 1993.

External links 

 Orfes de la Bíblia Article in El Temps magazine, 1994, by Jordi Ventura. 

Incunabula
Early printed Bibles
1470s books
15th-century Christian texts